Taylor Lake Village is a city in Harris County in the U.S. state of Texas. The population was 3,704 at the 2020 U.S. census.

History

Geography

Taylor Lake Village is located at  (29.574216, –95.055327).

Demographics

The U.S. Census Bureau reported a population of 3,544 in 2010, and a 3,571 at the 2019 American Community Survey.

As of the 2020 United States census, there were 3,704 people, 1,314 households, and 1,164 families residing in the city.

At the census of 2000, there were 3,694 people, 1,341 households, and 1,177 families residing in the city. The population density was 2,974.2 people per square mile (1,150.2/km). There were 1,364 housing units at an average density of 1,098.2/sq mi (424.7/km). The racial makeup of the city was 92.39% White, 2.71% African American, 0.49% Native American, 2.06% Asian, 0.14% Pacific Islander, 1.03% from other races, and 1.19% from two or more races. Hispanic or Latino of any race were 4.57% of the population.

There were 1,341 households, out of which 36.7% had children under the age of 18 living with them, 80.8% were married couples living together, 5.1% had a female householder with no husband present, and 12.2% were non-families. 11.0% of all households were made up of individuals, and 5.1% had someone living alone who was 65 years of age or older. The average household size was 2.75 and the average family size was 2.96.

In the city, the population was spread out, with 25.6% under the age of 18, 4.3% from 18 to 24, 22.7% from 25 to 44, 34.2% from 45 to 64, and 13.2% who were 65 years of age or older. The median age was 44 years. For every 100 females, there were 97.3 males. For every 100 females age 18 and over, there were 95.2 males.

The median income for a household in the city was $99,535, and the median income for a family was $102,873. Males had a median income of $83,358 versus $48,500 for females. The per capita income for the city was $43,936. About 0.4% of families and 1.0% of the population were below the poverty line, including 1.4% of those under age 18 and 1.1% of those age 65 or over.

Government and infrastructure
The Lakeview Police Department serves Taylor Lake Village and El Lago. In 1986 the two cities decided to merge their police departments. The merger was finished in January 1987. The administration is in El Lago.

Harris Health System (formerly Harris County Hospital District) designated Strawberry Health Center in Pasadena for ZIP code 77586. The nearest public hospital is Ben Taub General Hospital in the Texas Medical Center.

Education

Pupils in Taylor Lake Village attend schools in Clear Creek Independent School District. The community is within the Board of Trustees District 1, represented by Robert Allan Davee as of 2008.

Almost all of Taylor Lake Village is zoned to Robinson Elementary School in Pasadena, near Taylor Lake Village. A small portion is zoned to Ed White Elementary School in El Lago. All of the city is zoned to Seabrook Intermediate School (Seabrook), and Clear Falls High School (League City).

Residents were previously zoned to Clear Lake High School in Clear Lake City, Houston.

Prior to fall 2006, most of Taylor Lake Village was zoned to James F. Bay and Ed White Elementary.

The portion of Clear Creek ISD in Harris County (and therefore Taylor Lake Village) is assigned to San Jacinto College.

Parks 
Taylor Lake Village has a  community park, located at 500 Kirby Boulevard, behind City Hall. The park includes athletic fields, a jogging track, a fishing pier, a picnic pavilion, and playgrounds.

Harris County Precinct 2 operates the Bay Area Community Center at 5002 NASA Road 1 in nearby Pasadena.

References

External links

 City of Taylor Lake Village official website

G.W. Robinson Elementary School

Cities in Harris County, Texas
Cities in Texas
Greater Houston
Galveston Bay Area